A list of films produced in the Tamil film industry in India in 1998 by release date.

Films

January — March

April — June

July — September

October — December

Awards

Dubbed films

References

1998
Films, Tamil
Lists of 1998 films by country or language
1990s Tamil-language films